The Ghetto Fighters' House (Beit Lohamei Ha-Getaot), full name, Itzhak Katzenelson Holocaust and Jewish Resistance Heritage Museum, Documentation and Study Center, was founded in 1949 by members of Kibbutz Lohamei Hagetaot, a community of Holocaust survivors, among them fighters of the ghetto undergrounds and partisan units.  The museum is named after Itzhak Katzenelson, a Jewish poet who was murdered at Auschwitz.

The museum is located in the Western Galilee, Israel, on the Coastal Highway between Acre (Akko) and Nahariya.

The Ghetto Fighters' House is the world's first museum commemorating the Holocaust and Jewish heroism. It represents the highest expression of its founders' commitment to Holocaust education in Israel and the world. The museum tells the story of the Jewish people in the 20th century, and particularly during World War II and the Holocaust. At the center of the narrative is the individual, and the many expressions of Jewish resistance in ghettos, concentration camps, and partisan combat.

"Friends of GFH" associations are active in Israel, France, Austria, and the United States.

Departments and activities 
Museum exhibitions 
Guided tours (for groups in Hebrew and other languages)
The Zivia and Yitzhak "Antek" Zuckerman Study Center (facility for one-, two-, and three-day seminars)
The Yad LaYeled Children's Museum and memorial, telling the story of children during the Holocaust to the children of our day 
The International Book-Sharing Project, using children's books about the Holocaust to foster dialogue and understanding
The Center for Humanistic Education 
Archives (documents, photographs, artifacts, art collection, recordings, and more)
Library and Reference Room (resources and assistance for researchers, educators, and students) 
Department of Research on the Holocaust of Soviet Jewry
Publications Department

See also
Jewish resistance under Nazi rule
Warsaw Ghetto Uprising
Abraham Berline

References

External links 

Podcast about the exhibitions and educational work from the Ghetto Fighters' House

Museums established in 1949
Holocaust commemoration
Holocaust museums
Monuments and memorials in Israel
Jewish resistance during the Holocaust
Museums in Northern District (Israel)
History museums in Israel
Archives in Israel
1949 establishments in Israel